Meridian Power Station is a natural gas-fired station owned by TransAlta and  Husky Energy, located just southeast of Lloydminster, Saskatchewan, Canada.  The station is operated by TransAlta Cogeneration.

Description 

The station is operated as a cogeneration plant supplying electricity to Saskatchewan Grid under contract to SaskPower and steam to the Husky's Lloydminster heavy oil upgrader and the Husky Lloydminster Ethanol Plant.

References

Natural gas-fired power stations in Saskatchewan
Buildings and structures in Lloydminster